The Gauley River National Recreation Area, located near Summersville, West Virginia, protects a  portion of the Gauley River and a  segment of the Meadow River in southern West Virginia.  Little of the national recreation area is accessible via roads; one must travel via the river.  At the upstream end of the park is the Summersville Dam, the only area of the park accessible by vehicle.

Rapids
Within the park are a number of Class V rapids.  They have been given names such as:
 Insignificant
 Pillow Rock
 Lost Paddle
 Iron Ring
 Sweet's Falls

References

External links

Official NPS Site
Summersville Lake water levels and outflow

National Park Service National Recreation Areas
Protected areas of Fayette County, West Virginia
Protected areas of Nicholas County, West Virginia
National Park Service areas in West Virginia
Rivers of West Virginia
Rivers of Fayette County, West Virginia
Rivers of Nicholas County, West Virginia
IUCN Category V